The following is a list of the first woman to serve as mayor of their respective municipalities.

1900s 

1906
Lady Margaret Dockrell, first women chair of the Urban District Council of Monkstown, Ireland, United Kingdom 
1908
Elizabeth Garrett Anderson, first woman mayor in England and first female mayor of Aldeburgh, United Kingdom

1910s 

1910
Sarah Lees, first woman mayor of Oldham, in Lancashire, England 
Gwenllian Morgan, first woman mayor of Brecon, Wales, United Kingdom 
first woman mayor in Wales

1911
Kate F. O'Connor, first woman mayor of Arcadia, Illinois, United States 
Ella Wilson, first woman mayor of Hunnewell, Kansas 

1912
Clara C. Munson, first woman mayor of Warrenton, Oregon, United States 
also the first woman elected mayor following the passage of the equal suffrage law in Oregon. Some sources, including The Daily Astorian, erroneously call Munson the first woman elected mayor in Oregon, however, that distinction belongs to Alice E. Burns who was elected mayor of Florence, Oregon in 1895.
Mary E. Woolley Chamberlain, first woman mayor of Kanab, Utah, United States 
Susan Wissler, mayor of Dayton, Wyoming, United States 
Wissler was the first woman mayor in Wyoming

1913
Defenbaugh, first woman elected mayor in Tyro, Kansas, United States 

1914
Clara Latourell Larsson, first woman elected mayor of Troutdale, Oregon, United States 

1915
Angela Rose Canfield, first woman mayor of Warren, Illinois, United States 
Estelle Lawton Lindsey, first woman to execute the duties of Mayor of Los Angeles, California, United States  
it occurred when Los Angeles Mayor Henry R. Rose was absent from his post in September 1915 and directed Lindsey, a member of the city council, to fill-in as acting mayor.

1916
Ellen French Aldrich, first woman elected mayor of Sawtelle, United States 
C. I. Driver, first woman to serve as mayor of Lone Rock, Colorado, United States  
was appointed by the city council
Mary Alice Partington, first woman mayor of Glossop, in Derbyshire .

1917
Avis Francis, first woman mayor of Valley Center, Kansas, United States 
Ophelia "Birdie" Crosby Harwood, mayor of Marble Falls, Texas, United States 
also the first woman mayor in Texas, elected by an all-male vote three years before women were allowed to vote.
Marian Newhall Horwitz, first woman who served as mayor of Moore Haven, Florida, United States 
also first woman mayor in Florida
Laura Jane Starcher, first woman elected mayor of Umatilla, Oregon, United States 

1918
Blanch Shelley, first woman elected mayor of Sandy, Oregon, United States 
Maria Skobtsova, first woman mayor in the former Russian Empire and first female mayor of Anapa, Russia. 

1919
Helen B. Coe, first woman elected mayor of Langley, Washington, United States 
was elected with an all-woman city council
Ada Summers, first woman elected mayor of Stalybridge, in Cheshire, England

1920s 

 

1920
Hattie Barnes Adkisson, first woman mayor of Jewett, Texas, United States, 
Ellen Chapman, first woman elected mayor of Worthing, in West Sussex, England 
Lula V. Coleman first woman mayor of Jena, Louisiana, United States 
Coleman, who was serving as deputy sheriff of LaSalle Parish, was appointed mayor by Governor John M. Parker, making her the first woman to serve as mayor in Louisiana
Nora Gammon, first woman mayor of Thebes, Illinois, United States 
Louise Fussman, mayor Humboldt, Kansas, United States 
Grace B. Lampshire, first woman elected mayor of Burns, Oregon, United States  
also the first woman elected mayor in Oregon by write-in vote
Grace Miller, first woman elected mayor of Jackson, Wyoming, United States 
Bernice Pitts, first woman to execute the office of Mayor of Portland, Oregon, United States 
Pitts, a student at Richmond School, served as mayor in place of George Luis Baker for five minutes

1921
Ellen M. Anderson, first woman mayor of Lantana, Florida, United States 
Léonie Keingiaert de Gheluvelt, first woman elected mayor of Gheluvelt, Belgium 
also the first woman elected mayor in Belgium
Lillian Cox Gault, first woman elected mayor of St. Peter, Minnesota, United States 
also the first woman to serve as mayor in Minnesota
Christiana Hartley, first woman elected mayor of Southport, in Lancashire, England 
Amy A. Kaukonen, first woman elected mayor in Fairport Harbor, Ohio, United States 
Mayme Ousley, first woman elected mayor of St. James, Missouri, United States 
Ousley was also the first woman elected mayor in the state of Missouri
Mary Peterson, first woman elected mayor of Red Cloud, Nebraska, United States 
Florence J. Pierce, the first woman elected mayor of Goodhue, Minnesota, United States 
Dolly Spencer, first woman elected mayor of Milford, Ohio, United States 
Alice Harrell Strickland, first woman elected mayor of Duluth, Georgia, United States 
Strickland was the first woman elected mayor in the state of Georgia
Clara Winterbotham, first woman elected mayor of Cheltenham, in Gloucestershire, England 

1922
Beatrice Anna Cartwright, first woman elected mayor of Brackley, Northamptonshire, England, United Kingdom 
Dr. Josie Rogers, first woman mayor of Daytona, Florida, United States 
Ada Salter, Mayor of Bermondsey, first woman mayor in London 
Maude R. Satterthwaite, first woman mayor of Stonewall, North Carolina, United States 

1923
Catherine Alderton, first woman mayor of Colchester, Essex, England, United Kingdom 
Emma J. Harvat, first woman elected mayor of Iowa City, Iowa, United States 
first woman in the United States to be elected mayor of a city with more than 10,000 inhabitants
Mary McFadden, first woman mayor of Magnetic Springs, Ohio, United States 
was appointed by the city council at the age of 80.
 Janet Stancomb-Wills, first woman mayor of Ramsgate, Kent, England, United Kingdom 

1924
Kathrine M. Cowan, first woman mayor of Wilmington, North Carolina, United States 
Lucy Dales, first woman elected mayor of Dunstable, England, United Kingdom 
Jesse Elwyn Nelson, first woman elected mayor of Signal Hill, California, United States 
also Signal Hill's first mayor
Edwina Benner, first woman elected mayor of Sunnyvale, California, United States 
Carrie Maude Eve, first woman elected mayor of Stoke Newington, in London, England 
Alice U. Kerr, first woman elected mayor of Edmonds, Washington, United States 
Ethel Leach, first woman elected mayor of Great Yarmouth, in Norfolk, England 
Mary Mercer, first woman elected mayor of Birkenhead, in Cheshire, England 
Matilde Pérez Mollá, first woman elected mayor in Spain, (city of Gorga, Spain) 
Mildred Putnam, first woman elected mayor of Stoutsville, Missouri, United States 

1925
Rosa Belle Eaddy Woodberry Dickson, first woman elected mayor in South Carolina and first woman elected mayor of Johnsonville, South Carolina.
Rebecca Estell Bourgeois Winston, first woman elected mayor in New Jersey, United States , 
first mayor and founder of Estell Manor
Maude Duncan, first woman elected mayor of Winslow, Arkansas, United States 
Maggie Skipwith Smith, first woman elected mayor in Louisiana, United States 

1926
Mattle Chandler, first woman mayor of Richmond, California, United States 
Bertha Knight Landes, first woman Mayor of Seattle, Washington, United States 
first woman mayor of a major American city
Aasa Helgesen, first woman elected mayor of Utsira and first female mayor in Norway 

1927
Alzira Soriano de Souza, first female appointed mayor in Brazil 
also first female mayor of Lages
Fanne Gaar, first woman elected mayor in Arizona, mayor of Casa Grande, Arizona, United States 
Margaret Beavan, first woman elected Lord Mayor of Liverpool, England, United Kingdom 
first woman lord mayor in the United Kingdom
Lucia Foster Welch, first woman elected Mayor of Southampton, England, United Kingdom 

1928
Leah Arcouet Chiles, first woman elected mayor of Kenilworth Park, North Carolina, United States 
Lena Culver Hawkins, first woman mayor of Brooksville, Florida, United States 
Ella L. Maddocks, first woman mayor of Owls Head, Maine, United States 
"mayor" was an honorary title chosen by the Owls Head Select Committee
May B. Hopkins, first woman elected mayor of Redondo Beach, California, United States 
Alzira Soriano, first woman elected mayor in Latin America, mayor of Lajes, Rio Grande do Norte, Brazil 

1929
Emily Jones, first woman elected mayor of Eureka, United States 
Bessie Moore, first woman elected mayor of Candor (village), New York, United States 
Moore won by write-in vote and refused to take the oath of office

1930s 

1930
A. F. Board, first woman elected Mayor of Watford, England, United Kingdom 
Sadiye Hanım, first woman elected mayor in Turkey when elected for Kılıçkaya in Artvin 
Essie Ward, first woman elected mayor of King City, Missouri, United States 
Luiza Zavloschi, first woman elected mayor in Romania when elected for Buda (Bogdănești) 

1931
Miriam Moses, first woman elected mayor of Stepney, England, United Kingdom 
also the first Jewish woman mayor in the United Kingdom
Phenie Lou Ownby, first woman elected mayor of Broken Arrow, Oklahoma, United States 
Julia Platt, first woman elected mayor of Pacific Grove, California, United States 
Grace Prescott, first woman elected mayor of Godmanchester, England, United Kingdom 

1932
Stella Alexander, first woman elected mayor of Issaquah, Washington, United States 
Edna Allen, first woman elected mayor of Jefferson, Oregon, United States 
Elsie Kimber, first woman elected mayor of Newbury, England, United Kingdom 
June G. Olsen, first woman elected mayor of Ekalaka, Montana, United States 

1933
Elena Azcuy, first woman mayor of Consolación del Norte, Cuba 
Azcuy was the first woman to serve as mayor of a Cuban municipality.
Doris W. Bradway, first woman mayor of Wildwood, New Jersey, United States 
Lily Sophia Tawney, first woman elected mayor of Oxford, England, United Kingdom 
in 1960, the title was changed to Lord Mayor of Oxford.
Clara Marie Emma Heiser, first woman elected mayor of Ellsworth, Kansas, United States 

1934
Mrs. Solomon S. Youmans, first woman mayor of Oak Park, Georgia, United States 

1935
Alicia Cañas, first female elected mayor in Chile, the first of Providencia 
Louise Bucks, first woman elected mayor of Waconia, Minnesota, United States 

1936
Ella M. Amdahl, first woman elected mayor of Hingham, Montana, United States 
Aurora Mesa Andraca, first woman mayor of Chilpancingo, Guerrero, Mexico 
Barbara Hanley, first woman elected mayor in Canada when elected to office in Webbwood, Ontario 
Evalina Herd, first woman elected mayor of Kevin, Montana, United States 
Ann Eliza Longden, first woman elected Lord Mayor of Sheffield, England, United Kingdom 

1937
Mary Lucy Kyle Hartson, first woman elected mayor of Kyle, Texas, United States 
Ines V. Serion, the first woman elected mayor in Philippines—elected in Vallehermoso, Negros Oriental 
Kathrine Wykle, mayor of Clyde, New York, United States 
also the first woman mayor in New York

1938
Nellie Babcock, first woman mayor of Rochester, Indiana, United States 
Lilian Fowler, first woman mayor in Australia, at Newtown 
Lady Gwladys Delamere, first woman mayor of Nairobi, Kenya Colony (today Kenya) 
Nettie Terrill, first woman elected mayor of Dixon, Wyoming, United States 
Terrill ran unopposed

1939
Kathleen Clarke, first woman Lord Mayor of Dublin, Ireland 
Graciela Contreras, first woman elected mayor in Santiago, Chile 
Alice Burke, first woman elected as mayor in New England—in Westfield, Massachusetts, United States

1940s 
1940
Mary Ellen Presnell Brendle, first woman mayor of Englewood, Tennessee, United States 
1941
Elsie Chamberlain, first woman mayor of Bangor, Gwynedd, Wales, United Kingdom 
Marie Elizabeth May Bell, first woman mayor of Windhoek, South West Africa (today Namibia) 
Edna Annie Crichton, first woman Lord Mayor of York, England, United Kingdom 

1942
Gladys Maasdorp, first woman mayor of Salisbury, Southern Rhodesia (today Harare, Zimbabwe) 
Jessie Beatrice Kitson, first woman Lord Mayor of Leeds, England, United Kingdom 
took office after the previous male holder, Arthur Clark, died in office
Jessie Reed, first woman elected mayor of Seal Beach, California, United States 

1943
Edith May Greenan, first woman to serve as mayor of Avalon, New Jersey, United States 
Nellie Grace Ibbott, first woman mayor of Heidelberg, Victoria, Australia 

1944
Mary Carey Dondero, first woman mayor of Portsmouth, New Hampshire, United States 

1945
Mary Carey Dondero, first woman mayor of Portsmouth, New Hampshire, United States 
Ursula Meisterernst, first woman mayor of Arnstadt, Germany 
Meisterernst was the first woman to serve as mayor in Germany.
Mabel Nielsen, first woman mayor of Panguitch, Utah, United States 
Odette Roux, first woman mayor of Les Sables-d'Olonne and the first woman mayor in France 
Walker, first woman mayor of Lisle (village), New York, United States 

1946
Virginia Oteyza-De Guia, first woman mayor of Baguio, Philippines 
Doris Barnes, first woman elected mayor of Wrangell, Alaska, United States 
Truus Smulders-Beliën, first woman mayor of Oost-, West- en Middelbeers and the first woman mayor in Netherlands 
Luise Albertz, first woman elected mayor in Oberhausen and the first elected female mayor (Oberbürgermeisterin) in Germany 
Felisa Rincón de Gautier, first woman mayor of San Juan, Puerto Rico 
first woman mayor of a capital city in United States soil
Ninetta Bartoli, first woman mayor in Italy and first female mayor in Sardinia.

1947
Juliet M. Gregory, first woman elected mayor of Missoula, Montana, United States 
Mary Kingsmill Jones, first elected female Lord Mayor of Manchester, England, United Kingdom 
Sarah G. Leffler, first female mayor of Mt. Lebanon, Pennsylvania, United States 
also the first woman elected mayor in Pennsylvania
Louise Schroeder, first female mayor of Berlin, Germany 

1948
Zenzi Hölzl, first female mayor of Gloggnitz and also the first female mayor in Austria 
Belle Cooledge, first female mayor of Sacramento, California, United States 
Mildred Stark, first female mayor of East Detroit (now Eastpointe), Michigan
also first female mayor in Michigan

1949
Gertrude A. Richardson, first woman mayor of Taree, New South Wales, Australia  
also the first woman mayor of a municipality in New South Wales
Beryl Archibald Crichlow, first female mayor of San Fernando, and the first woman elected mayor in Trinidad and Tobago 
Dorothy McCullough Lee, first woman mayor of Portland, Oregon, United States 
Edith P. Welty, first woman Mayor of Yonkers, New York, United States 
Salawati Daud, first woman mayor of Makassar, Indonesia and the first female mayor in Indonesia

1950s 
1950
Dorothy Davis, first woman mayor of Washington, Virginia, United States 
Kathleen Harper, first woman to serve as mayor of Bath, England, United Kingdom 
Jacquetta Marshall, first woman mayor of Plymouth, England, United Kingdom 
Dorothy Painter Crawford, first woman elected mayor in Mississippi, Madison, Mississippi 
Erika Keck, first woman elected mayor in Ahrensburg and the first elected female mayor (Bürgermeisterin) in Germany 
Katharine Elkus White, first woman mayor of Red Bank, New Jersey, United States 
Müfide İlhan, first woman elected mayor in Turkey and of Mersin 
Augustine Magdalena Waworuntu, first woman mayor of Manado, Indonesia 
Rohana Muthalib, first woman mayor of Pontianak, Indonesia 

1951
Blanche Barkl, first woman mayor of Bankstown, New South Wales, Australia 
Miriam Cummings, first woman elected mayor of Mill Valley, California, United States 
Rebekah H. Hord, first woman mayor in Kentucky, Maysville Kentucky, United States 
Emily L. Perry, first woman mayor of Floyd, Iowa, United States 
Charlotte Whitton, first woman elected mayor of Ottawa, Ontario, Canada 
Olga Maturana, first woman elected Mayor of Pichilemu, Chile 
Vera Martucci, first woman appointed mayor of Teterboro, New Jersey, United States 
Bertha Trim, first woman elected mayor of Plainview, Minnesota, United States 

1952
Violet Grantham, first woman elected Lord Mayor of Newcastle-upon-Tyne, England, United Kingdom 
Alice S. Johnson, first woman elected mayor of Boston, Lincolnshire, England, United Kingdom 
Martha Priscilla Shaw, first woman elected Mayor of Sumter, South Carolina, United States 
Alice L. Stratton, first woman elected mayor of Beech Grove, Indiana, United States 

1953
Elsie Gibbons, first woman elected mayor of an municipality in the Canadian province of Quebec 
Agnes Israelson, first woman elected mayor in Thief River Falls, Minnesota, United States 
Dorothy Porter, first woman elected mayor in Nevada and first woman elected mayor of North Las Vegas, Nevada, United States 

1954
Dorothy N. Dolbey, first woman elected mayor in Cincinnati, Ohio, United States 
Emílie Knotková, first woman elected mayor in Liberec, Czechoslovakia 
Olive Louise Urquhart, first woman mayor of Pointe-Claire, Quebec, Canada 
also the first woman mayor in Quebec
Adela Van Severen, first woman mayor of Santa Tecla, El Salvador 
also the first woman mayor in the country

1955
Ragina Balas, first woman elected mayor of Ferry Village, New York, United States 
Jane Forrester, first woman elected mayor of Belleville, Ontario, Canada 
Maud Godsmark, first woman elected mayor of Gatooma, Southern Rhodesia (now Kadoma, Zimbabwe) 
Alba Roballo, first woman elected to the (then collective) Municipal Council of Montevideo, Uruguay 
Mary Van Stevens, first woman elected mayor of Heppner, Oregon, United States  
She resigned in 1956 after purchasing a business in The Dalles, Oregon, United States .

1956
Maria Desylla-Kapodistria, first woman elected mayor in Greece and of Corfu (city) 
Dorothy Edwards, first woman elected mayor in Tasmania, Australia and of Launceston 
Hannah Levin, first woman mayor of Rishon LeZion, Israel 
Smt. Sulochana M. Modi, first woman elected mayor in Mumbai, India 
Myrth Sarvela, first woman elected mayor of Sitka, Alaska, United States 
Mary Estus Jones Webb, first woman to serve as Mayor-President of Baton Rouge, Louisiana, United States  
Winnifred Breward, first woman elected mayor of West Hartlepool, United Kingdom 

1957
Lolita Cass, first mayor of Watkins Glen, New York, United States 
Josephine Fey, first woman mayor in Laramie, Wyoming, United States 
Hulda Dóra Jakobsdóttir, first woman elected mayor in Kópavogur and first female mayor in Iceland 
Elizabeth Hall, first woman mayor of Sag Harbor, New York
Betty Potter, first woman mayor of Mount Kisco, New York, United States 

1958
Aruna Asaf Ali, first woman elected mayor in Delhi, India 
Tara Cherian, first woman elected mayor in Chennai, India 
Iris Winnifred King, first woman elected mayor in Kingston, Jamaica 
Aldamira Guedes Fernandes, first woman elected mayor in Brazil and also first female mayor of Quixeramobim 
Ester Roa, first woman elected mayor in Concepción, Chile 
Mary Pearce, first woman elected Lord Mayor of Leeds, England, United Kingdom 

1959
Barbara Ashton, first woman elected mayor of Que Que, Southern Rhodesia (today Kwekwe, Zimbabwe) 
Helena Evans, first woman elected Lord Mayor of Cardiff, Wales, United Kingdom 
Jane Dowdall, first woman elected Lord Mayor of Cork, Ireland 
Joyce Newton-Thompson, first woman elected mayor of Cape Town, South Africa

1960s 

1960
Auður Auðuns, first woman mayor of Reykjavik, Iceland 
Dame Jean Roberts, first woman Lord Provost of Glasgow, Scotland, United Kingdom 
first woman lord provost. "Provost" is used instead of "mayor" in Scotland
Margot Brett, first woman mayor of Bulawayo, Southern Rhodesia (today Zimbabwe) 

1961
Barbara Saben, first woman mayor of Kampala, Uganda 
May Ross McDowell, first woman elected mayor of Johnson City, Tennessee, United States 
Violet Kusbel Cimbora, first woman elected mayor in Florida. Mayor of Masaryktown, Florida, United States 
Myrtle Reed, first woman mayor of Grand River, Ohio, United States 

1962
Eleanor P. Sheppard, first woman elected mayor of Richmond, Virginia, United States 
Leonida Tămaș, first woman mayor of Timișoara, Romania 

1963
Teena Clifton, first woman mayor of Rolling Hills, California, United States 
Florence E. Douglas, first woman elected mayor of Vallejo, California, United States 
Marian Erdmann, first woman elected mayor of Great Falls, Montana, United States 
Ann Hitch Kilgore, first woman mayor of Hampton, Virginia, United States 
Anita Fernandini de Naranjo, first woman mayor of Lima, Peru 
Florence Mills Brown, first woman elected lord mayor of Bristol, England, United Kingdom 

1964
Lenore Bishop, first woman mayor of Mount Gambier, South Australia, Australia 
also first woman mayor in South Australia
Vera Kolarič, first woman mayor of Maribor (present Slovenia) 
Margaret H. Prickett, first woman elected mayor of Mishawaka, Indiana, United States 

1965
Norma O. Walker, first woman mayor of Aurora, Colorado, United States 
Annie Major, first elected female Lord mayor of Kingston upon Hull, England, United Kingdom 
Florence Kathleen Lower, first woman elected Lord Mayor of Oxford, England, United Kingdom 
Grace Onyango, first woman elected mayor of Kisumu, Kenya 
also the first African woman who was a mayor of an African city

1966
Constance Cummings-John, first appointed woman mayor of Freetown, Sierra Leone 
Bernice Stokke, first woman mayor of Petersburg, Alaska, United States 

1967
Norma Villareal de Zambrano, first woman mayor in Mexico 
Ann Uccello, first woman mayor of Hartford, Connecticut, United States 
Grace Hartman, first woman mayor of Sudbury, Ontario, Canada 
Janet Wesonga, first woman mayor of Mbale, Uganda 
Mary "Peggy" Kerr, first woman mayor of Sayreville, New Jersey, United States 
was elected with three female councilwomen, creating the first female-majority municipal government in New Jersey
Nellie Robinson, first woman mayor of Toowoomba, Queensland, Australia 
also the first woman mayor in Queensland
Maxing Patterson, first woman elected mayor of Edgerton, Wyoming, United States 
Patterson ran unopposed
Marie Madoé Sivomey, first woman mayor of Lomé, Togo 
also the first woman mayor in the country

1968
Silvia Boza, first woman mayor of Las Condes, Chile 
Lise Girardin, first woman Mayor of Geneva, Switzerland 
Hsu Shih-Hsien, first woman elected mayor of Chiayi City and the first woman elected mayor in Taiwan 
Rena Parker, first woman mayor of Corona, California, United States 
Jean Robinson, first woman elected mayor of Blackpool, England, United Kingdom 

1969
Pilar Careaga Basabe, first woman mayor of Bilbao, Spain 
Eve Homeyer, first woman elected mayor of Aspen, Colorado, United States 
Viola Phillips, first woman mayor elected in Loveland, Ohio, United States 
also first woman mayor in Hamilton County

1970s 

1970
Margaret Kenyatta, first black female mayor of Nairobi, Kenya 
Dabir Azam Hosna, first woman elected mayor of Babolsar, Iran 
Colette Flesch, first woman elected mayor of Luxembourg City, Luxembourg 

1971
Linda A. Blogoslawski, first woman elected mayor of New Britain, Connecticut, United States 
Patience Latting, first woman elected mayor of Oklahoma City, Oklahoma, United States 
 Latting was also the first female mayor of any major U.S. city with more than 350,000 residents.
Kathryn Kirschbaum, first woman elected mayor of Davenport, Iowa, United States 
Lorette Wood, first woman mayor of Santa Cruz, California, United States 
Norene Mosley, first woman elected mayor of Polson, Montana, United States 

1972
Mila Elaine Cameron, first woman elected mayor of Point Comfort, Texas, United States 
Ellen Walker Craig-Jones, first woman elected mayor of Urbancrest, Ohio, United States 
also the first African-American woman to be elected mayor by popular vote of a United States municipality.
Phyllis Loe, first woman elected Lord mayor of Portsmouth, United Kingdom 
Jane Bigelow, first woman mayor of London, Ontario, Canada 
Stella Harris Oaks, first woman to serve as mayor of Vernal, Utah, United States 
Oaks was served as acting mayor
Marian Perry Whitehurst, first woman mayor of Chesapeake, Virginia, United States 

1973
Jemima Cook, first woman elected mayor of Twin Bridges, Montana, United States 
Doris A. Davis, first woman mayor of Compton, California, United States 
Lelia Foley, first African American woman mayor in the United States and first woman mayor of Taft, Oklahoma 
Eileen Lloyd, first woman elected mayor of Keansburg, New Jersey, United States 
Marjorie Alice Brown, first woman elected Lord mayor of Birmingham, United Kingdom 
Julianne M. Jensen was elected the first woman mayor of Knoxville, Iowa, United States 
Barbara Impellittiere, first woman elected mayor of Cold Spring, New York, United States 
Jane McCormick Tolmach first woman elected Mayor of Oxnard, California, United States 

1974
Diane L. Bervig, First elected Mayor of Williston, North Dakota, United States  
Janet Gray Hayes, first woman elected Mayor of San Jose, California, United States 
Hayes was also the first female mayor of a major U.S. city with more than 500,000 residents.
Eleanor Kieliszek, first woman elected Mayor of Teaneck, New Jersey, United States 
Carrie Kent, first African-American woman mayor of Walthourville, Georgia, United States 
Anne Kaplan, first woman mayor of Monticello, New York, United States 

1975
Ruth Blankman, first woman elected mayor of Canton, New York, United States 
Helen Boosalis, first woman elected mayor of Lincoln, Nebraska, United States 
Mary Byrne, first woman elected mayor of Galway, Ireland 
Ione Christensen, first woman elected mayor of Whitehorse, Yukon, Canada 
Lila Cockrell, first woman elected mayor of San Antonio, Texas, United States 
Joy Cummings, first woman elected Lord Mayor of Newcastle (New South Wales), Australia 
Beth Finch, first woman elected mayor of Fayetteville, North Carolina, United States 
Betty Edmondson, first woman mayor of Yakima, Washington, United States 
Evelyn Helena Parker, first woman mayor of Subiaco, Western Australia, Australia 
also the first woman mayor in Western Australia
Connie Ames Peters, first woman elected mayor of Wichita, Kansas, United States 
Jeannette Plambeck, first woman mayor of Burns, Wyoming, United States 
Eleanor A. Simpson, first woman elected mayor in Old Westbury, New York, United States 
also first woman elected mayor in Nassau County, New York
Ella Stack, first woman elected Lord Mayor of Darwin, Australia 

1976
Unita Blackwell, first African American woman elected mayor in Mississippi, United States 
served as Mayor of Mayersville, Mississippi from 1976 to 2001
Sofía Medina de López, first woman elected mayor of Medellín, Colombia 
Adelina Rodriguez, first woman elected mayor of Quezon City, Philippines 
Margaret Hance, first woman elected Mayor of Phoenix, Arizona, United States 
Adlene Harrison, first woman mayor of Dallas, Texas, United States 
Floretta K. Lauber, first woman mayor of Arcadia, California, United States 
Dorothy Wilken, first woman elected mayor of Boca Raton, Florida, United States 
Phyllis Sweeney, first woman elected mayor of Laguna Beach, California, United States 

1977

Maria Barnaby Greenwald, first woman elected mayor of Cherry Hill, New Jersey
Isabella Cannon, first woman elected mayor of Raleigh, North Carolina, United States 
Eleanor Crouch, first woman elected mayor of Santa Paula, California, United States 
Joyce Ebert, first woman to serve as mayor of Everett Washington, United States 
Carole Keeton Strayhorn, first woman elected mayor of Austin, Texas, United States 
Betty Marshall, first woman elected Mayor of York, Pennsylvania, United States 
Suzi Oppenheimer, first woman elected mayor of Mamaroneck (village), New York, United States 
Mathilde Schroyens, first woman elected mayor of Antwerp, Belgium 

1978
Dianne Feinstein, first woman and first person of Jewish faith to serve as Mayor of San Francisco, United States 
Feinstein was appointed mayor on December 4, 1978 following the shooting death of her predecessor, George Moscone. In 1979, she became the first woman elected Mayor of San Francisco.
Enma González, first elected female Mayor of Vigo, Spain 
Dusty Miller, first woman elected Mayor of Thunder Bay, Ontario, Canada 
Marjorie Carroll, first woman elected Mayor of Waterloo, Ontario, Canada 
Helen Wilkes, first woman to become Mayor of West Palm Beach, Florida, United States 
Frances Prince, first woman to become mayor of Thousand Oaks, California, United States 
also served 1983 to 1984

1979
Núria Albó, first woman elected mayor of La Garriga, Spain 
Jane M. Byrne, first woman elected Mayor of Chicago, Illinois, United States, United States 
Byrne was also the first female mayor of any United States city with more than 3 million residents.
Clo Hoover, first woman elected mayor of Santa Monica, California, United States 
Delitha Kilgore, first woman elected mayor of Lewiston, Idaho, United States 
Virginia Smith, first woman mayor of Ticonderoga, New York, United States 
Regina Zokosky, first woman elected mayor of Indio, California, United States

1980s 

1980
Janice Bateman, first woman mayor of Berwick, Victoria, Australia 
Sr. Carolyn Farrell, first woman elected mayor of Dubuque, Iowa, United States 
Farrell was the first nun elected mayor in Iowa
Josephine Heckman, first woman elected mayor of Pasadena, California, United States 
Patricia Logan, first woman elected mayor of Noblesville, Indiana, United States 
Janet Smith, first woman elected mayor of St. Albans (city), Vermont, United States 
less than a week after she was sworn-in Smith was shot and killed at her home.

1981
Joy Burgess, first woman elected mayor of Milwaukie, Oregon, United States 
Ruth Burleigh, first woman elected mayor of Bend, Oregon, United States 
Juanita Crabb, first woman elected Mayor of Binghamton, New York, United States 
Eileen Anderson, first woman elected Mayor of Honolulu, Hawaii, United States 
Maria Barnaby Greenwald, first woman elected Mayor of Cherry Hill, New Jersey, United States 
previously served from 1977 to 1979 as chosen by city council
Violet Khouri, first woman elected mayor of Kafr Yasif and the first female mayor in Israel 
Mary K. Shell, first woman elected mayor of Bakersfield, California, United States 
Deborah Ponder Baker, first woman mayor of Hot Springs, North Carolina, United States 
Dr. G. M. Wells, first woman elected mayor of Enterprise, Kansas, United States 

1982
Claudette Kaye McCrary, first woman elected mayor of Casper, Wyoming, United States 
Kathryn J. Whitmire, first woman elected mayor of Houston, Texas, United States 
Tina Tomlje, first woman mayor of Ljubljana, present Slovenia 
Grace Bannister, first woman elected Lord Mayor of Belfast, United Kingdom 
Patricia Rustad, first woman elected mayor of Beaconsfield, Quebec, Canada 
Kit Ward, first woman mayor of Nuneaton and Bedworth, England, United Kingdom 
Sue Marie Young, first woman elected mayor of Richfield, Utah, United States 

1983
Mary Donaldson, Baroness Donaldson of Lymington, first woman elected Lord Mayor of London, England, United Kingdom 
Luiza Erundina, first woman elected mayor of São Paulo, Brasil 
Wendy Chapman, first woman elected Lord Mayor of Adelaide, Australia 
Edith Henningsgaard, first woman elected mayor of Astoria, Oregon, United States 
Elizabeth Kishkon, first woman elected mayor of Windsor, Ontario, Canada 
Sue Miller, first woman elected mayor of Salem, Oregon, United States 
Eve Poole, first woman elected mayor of Invercargill, New Zealand 
Elda Pucci, first woman elected mayor of Palermo, Italy 
also the first female mayor of an Italian city
Catherine Tizard, first woman elected mayor of Auckland, New Zealand 
Helen Westberg, first woman mayor of Carbondale, Illinois, United States 

1984
Daurene Lewis, first black female mayor in Nova Scotia, Canada (Annapolis Royal) 
Mary Kate Stovall, first female, first African American mayor of Hurtsboro, Alabama, United States 
Donna Owens, first woman elected Mayor of Toledo, Ohio, United States 
Karen Johnson, first woman elected mayor of Schenectady, New York, United States  
Elsie Wayne, first woman elected mayor of Saint John, New Brunswick Canada 

1985

Sallyanne Atkinson, first woman elected Lord Mayor of Brisbane, Australia 
first woman member of the Liberal Party of Australia to serve as Lord Mayor
Ella Bengel, first woman elected mayor of New Bern, North Carolina, United States 
Dee Donne, the first woman elected mayor of Torrington, Connecticut, United States 
Bogdana Glumac-Levakov, first woman elected mayor of Zrenjanin, present Serbia  
Shirley Huffman, first woman elected mayor of Hillsboro, Oregon, United States 
Lorna Kesterson, first woman elected mayor of Henderson, Nevada, United States 
Gerri Lynn O'Connor, first woman elected mayor of Uxbridge, Ontario, Canada 
Ann Pomykal, first woman elected mayor of Lewisville, Texas, United States 
Joan Barr, first woman elected mayor of Evanston, Illinois, United States 
Kristi M. Vetri, first woman elected mayor of O'Fallon, Illinois, United States 

1986
Julene Kennerly, first woman elected mayor of Browning, Montana, United States 
also the first Native American woman elected mayor in the United States
Alexis Ord, first woman elected mayor of Lord Mayor of Melbourne, Australia 
Gretchen Brewin, first woman elected mayor of Victoria, British Columbia, Canada 
Doone Kennedy, first woman elected Lord Mayor of Hobart, Tasmania, Australia 
Maria Luíza Fontenele, first woman elected mayor of Fortaleza, Brasil 
Maureen O'Connor, first woman elected mayor of San Diego, California, United States 
Jessie M. Rattley, first woman and African American elected by fellow Council members as mayor of the City of Newport News, Virginia, United States 
Lois Reed, first woman elected mayor of Malinta, Ohio, United States 
Reed served for ten minutes before tendering her resignation

1987
Maria Magnani Noya, first woman elected mayor of Turin, Italy 
Carrie Saxon Perry, first woman elected mayor of Hartford, Connecticut, United States 
Sandra Warshaw Freedman, first woman elected mayor of Tampa, Florida, United States 
May Cutler, first woman elected mayor of Westmount, Quebec, Canada 
Sue Myack, first woman elected Mayor of Charlotte, North Carolina, United States 
Lottie Shackelford, first woman to serve as mayor of Little Rock, Arkansas, United States 
Laura Slate, first woman elected mayor of Gouverneur, New York, United States 
Annette Strauss, first woman elected mayor of Dallas, Texas, United States 
Betty Turner, first woman elected mayor of Corpus Christi, Texas, United States 
Helen Perkins, first woman elected mayor of Hollandale, Mississippi, United States 
also the city's first African American mayor

1988
Agnes Devanadera, first woman elected mayor of Sampaloc, Quezon, Philippines
Elizabeth H. Dwarica, first woman elected mayor of Leonia, New Jersey, United States 
Luiza Erundina, first woman elected mayor of São Paulo, Brazil 
Eleanor McLaughlin, first woman Lord Provost of Edinburgh, Scotland, United Kingdom 
Sophie Masloff, first woman elected Mayor of Pittsburgh, Pennsylvania, United States 
Meyera E. Oberndorf, first woman elected mayor of Virginia Beach, Virginia, United States 
Joyce Trimmer, first woman elected mayor of Scarborough, Ontario, Canada 
Rosalia I. Umali, first woman elected Mayor of Calapan, Oriental Mindoro, Philippines 

1989
Annette Jäger, first female mayor of Essen, Germany 
Catherine Trautmann, first woman elected mayor of Strasbourg, France 
Jan Reimer, first woman elected mayor of Edmonton, Alberta, Canada 
Vicki Buck, first woman elected Mayor of Christchurch, New Zealand 
Krystyna Nesteruk, first woman elected mayor of Katowice, Poland 
Janice Stork, first woman elected Mayor of Lancaster, Pennsylvania, United States 
Suzie Azar, first woman elected mayor of El Paso, Texas, United States 
Martha S. Wood, first woman elected mayor of Winston-Salem, North Carolina, United States 
Clementina Ródenas, first woman elected mayor of Valencia, Spain

1990s 

1990
Hazel Beard, first woman elected mayor of Shreveport, Louisiana, United States 
Franciszka Cegielska first woman elected mayor of Gdynia, Poland 
Alice Jempsa, Los Alamitos, California, United States 
Rohani Darus Danil first woman mayor of Tebing Tinggi, Indonesia 

1991
Cosetta Castagno, first woman elected mayor of Vernon, Utah, United States 
Ruth Devenney, first woman mayor of Kiama, New South Wales, Australia 
Harue Kitamura, first woman elected mayor of Ashiya, Japan 
Moira Leiper Ducharme, first woman elected mayor of Halifax, Nova Scotia, Canada 
Linda Lingle, first woman elected Mayor of Maui, Hawaii, United States 
Sharon Pratt Kelly, first woman elected Mayor of the District of Columbia, United States 
Ana Rosa Payán, first woman elected mayor of Mérida, Mexico 
June Rowlands, first woman elected mayor of Toronto, Ontario, Canada 
Kaba Rougui Barry, first woman elected mayor of Matam, Guinea 
Susan Weiner, first woman elected Mayor of Savannah, Georgia, United States 
Elizabeth Brater, first woman elected Mayor of Ann Arbor, Michigan, United States 
Joyce Johnson, first woman mayor of Orem, Utah, United States 
Mary Kanyha, first woman mayor of Pine Knoll Shores, North Carolina, United States 

1992
Deedee Corradini, first woman elected mayor of Salt Lake City, Utah, United States 
 Irene Sáez was elected mayor of Chacao Municipality, the wealthiest of the five municipalities of Caracas and, after her outstandingly satisfactory work, she was reelected in 1995 without having to do any campaign, obtaining a 96% of votes.
Sonia Durán de Infante, first woman in function of mayor of Bogotá, Colombia 
Rose Janneire, first woman elected mayor of Arima, Trinidad and Tobago 
Jane Robbins, first woman elected mayor of Pine City, Minnesota, United States 
Marilyn Roman, first woman to serve as Mayor of Jersey City, New Jersey, United States 
served as acting mayor for over four months following the removal of her predecessor, Gerald McCann, who was convicted of fraud
Ann-Marit Sæbønes, first woman elected mayor of Oslo, Norway 
M. Susan Savage, first woman elected mayor Tulsa, Oklahoma, United States 
Claire Stewart, first woman elected mayor of New Plymouth, New Zealand 
Susan Thompson, first woman elected mayor of Winnipeg, Manitoba, Canada 
Fran Wilde, first woman elected mayor of Wellington, New Zealand 
Cheryll Woods-Flowers, first woman elected mayor of Mount Pleasant, South Carolina, United States 
Stella Welsh, first woman elected mayor of Orem, Utah, United States 
Welsh defeated Joyce Johnson, the first woman mayor of Orem who was appointed by the city council, in the 1991 general election

1993
Eunice Britto, first woman elected mayor Mangalore (Mangaluru), India 
Rita Cutajar, first woman mayor of Għasri (Gozo), and also first female mayor in Malta 
Slobodanka Gruden, first woman elected mayor of Belgrade, Serbia 
Ildikó Asztalos, first woman elected mayor of Miskolc, Hungary 
Agnethe Davidsen, first woman elected mayor of Nuuk, Greenland 
Ruth Bascom, first woman mayor of Eugene, Oregon, United States 
Frances Gibbs, first woman elected mayor of Peekskill, New York.
Anne Jones, first woman elected mayor of Pottstown, Pennsylvania, United States 
Sylvia Kerckhoff first woman elected mayor of Durham, North Carolina
Shirley Seney, first woman mayor of Lake Placid, New York, United States 
Judy Green, first woman to serve as mayor of Oviedo, Florida, United States 
Sharon Sayles Belton, first woman and first African-American elected mayor of Minneapolis, Minnesota, United States 

1994

Patricia Candiano, first woman mayor of Asbury Park, New Jersey, United States 
Dagmar Lastovecká, first woman elected mayor of Brno, Czech Republic 
Marie-Luise Smeets, first woman elected mayor of Düsseldorf, Germany 

1995
Muriel Allerton, first woman elected mayor of Fulton, Oswego County, New York, United States 
Soledad Becerril, first elected female mayor of Seville, Spain 
Ivi Eenmaa, first woman mayor of Tallinn, Estonia 
Christine Korff, first woman elected mayor of Port Chester, New York, United States 
Mary Lou Makepeace, first woman mayor of Colorado Springs, Colorado, United States 
Petra Roth first woman elected mayor of Frankfurt, Germany 
Luisa Fernanda Rudi, first elected female mayor of Saragossa, Spain 
Joan Shafer, first woman elected mayor of Surprise, Arizona, United States 
Saroj Singh, first woman elected mayor of Varanasi, India 
Sukhi Turner, first woman elected mayor of Dunedin, New Zealand
Celia Villalobos, first elected female mayor of Málaga, Spain 
Rosemary Waldorf, first woman elected Mayor of Chapel Hill, North Carolina, United States 

1996
Margaret Farquhar, first woman elected Lord Provost of Aberdeen, Scotland, United Kingdom 
Marina Matulović-Dropulić, first woman in function of mayor of Zagreb, Croatia 
(appointed 1996, elected 1997)
Eva-Riitta Siitonen, first woman elected mayor of Helsinki, Finland 

1997
Sue Bauman,, first woman elected mayor of Madison, Wisconsin, United States 
Fay Brennan, first woman elected mayor of Wyong, New South Wales, Australia 
Jessica Maes, first woman elected mayor of Huntington Park, California, United States 
Joan Wagnon, first woman elected of mayor of Topeka, Kansas, United States 
Tokozile Xasa, first woman elected mayor of Amathole District, Eastern Cape, South Africa 
also first woman mayor in Eastern Cape

1998
Maria Clara Lobregat, first woman elected Mayor of Zamboanga City, Philippines 
Elenita Binay, first woman elected Mayor of Makati City, Philippines 
Fran Barford, first woman elected mayor of Temple Terrace, Florida, United States 
Barford ran unopposed
Roxanne Browning, first women elected mayor of Northport, New York, United States 
Janet Crampsey, first woman mayor of Carrickfergus, Northern Ireland, United Kingdom 
Miriam Feirberg, first woman elected mayor of Netanya, Israel 
Betty Flores, first woman elected mayor of Laredo, Texas, United States 
Yael German, first woman elected mayor of Herzliya, Israel 
Diane Mathis, first woman mayor of Tulare, California, United States 
Fikile Mtembu, first woman elected mayor of Manzini, Swaziland 
also first woman mayor in Swaziland
Maria O'Brien Campbell, first woman mayor of Drogheda, Ireland 
Vilma Santos, first woman elected mayor of Lipa City, Philippines 
Sarojini Yogeswaran, first woman elected mayor of Jaffna, Sri Lanka 
she was assassinated three months into her term
Molly Mulyahati Djubaedi, first woman mayor of Sukabumi, Indonesia 

1999
Rosa Aguilar, first woman elected mayor of Córdoba, Spain 
Yolanda Barcina, first woman elected mayor of Pamplona, Spain 
Kay Barnes, first woman elected Mayor of Kansas City, Missouri, United States 
Paz Fernández, first woman elected mayor of Gijón, Spain 
Jan Laverty Jones, first woman elected Mayor of Las Vegas, Nevada, United States 
Patricia Nawa, first woman elected mayor of Lusaka, Zambia 
Shirley Robb, first woman elected mayor of Princeton, Indiana, United States 
Rosario Robles, first woman appointed Head of Government of the Federal District in Mexico City, Mexico 
in Mexico City, "Head of Government of the Federal District" is the equivalent of a mayor.
Theresia Samaria, first woman elected mayor of Walvis Bay, Namibia 
Frankie Seaberry, first woman elected mayor of Centerville, Missouri, United States 
Jennifer Stultz, first woman elected mayor of Gastonia, North Carolina, United States 
Helen Wright, first woman elected Lord Provost of Dundee, Scotland, United Kingdom 
Yvonne Thorne, first woman elected mayor of Dorset Council in Tasmania, Australia 
Blanca Vela, first woman elected mayor of Brownsville, Texas, United States 
Deborah C. Whitcraft, the first woman elected mayor of Beach Haven, New Jersey, United States 
Sharon J. Bilinski, the first woman elected Mayor of Pana, Illinois, United States, May 1, 1999.

See also 

 List of first women governors and/or chief ministers
 List of first women mayors
 List of first women mayors (18th and 19th centuries)
 List of first women mayors (21st century)
 List of first women mayors in the United States
 List of the first female holders of political offices
 Women in government

References

Lists of mayors
Mayors
Lists of women politicians
20th